The seventh full elections for Guildford Borough Council took place on 4 May 1995.  The results saw the Liberal Democrats win majority control of the council for the first time winning 23 of the 45 seats.  The Conservatives won 13 seats.  Labour retained 6 seats and 3 independents were elected.

Compared to the 1991 council elections, the Liberal Democrats gained 4 net seats, gaining 7 and losing 3.  Compared to the 1991 council elections the Conservatives lost 6 net seats, losing 7 and gaining 1.  Compared to the 1991 council elections there were 2 more independents on the council.

The Liberal Democrats gained Merrow and Burpham ward, with 3 councillors, from the Conservatives and Worplesdon ward, also with three councillors, from the Conservatives.  The Conservatives additionally lost their one councillor on Tillingbourne ward to the Liberal Democrats.

To the west of the borough the Liberal Democrats lost 3 councillors.  The Liberal Democrats lost both Ash Vale councillors to the Putting Ash Vale First group and the Liberal Democrats also lost one of their three councillors in the neighbouring Ash ward to the Conservatives.

Results

References

1995
1995 English local elections
1990s in Surrey